Mast cell activation syndrome (MCAS) is a term referring to one of two types of mast cell activation disorder (MCAD); the other type is idiopathic MCAD. MCAS is an immunological condition in which mast cells inappropriately and excessively release chemical mediators, resulting in a range of chronic symptoms, sometimes including anaphylaxis or near-anaphylaxis attacks. Primary symptoms include cardiovascular, dermatological, gastrointestinal, neurological and respiratory problems. 

MCAS is an umbrella term that describes a set of symptoms; it is not a specific diagnosis. Multiple diagnostic schemes for MCAS have been proposed. MCAS has been increasingly over-diagnosed or misdiagnosed.

Signs and symptoms
MCAS is an inflammatory condition that affects multiple systems. MCAS can present with a wide range of symptoms in multiple body systems, these symptoms may range from digestive discomfort to chronic pain, mental issues as well as an anaphylactic reaction. Symptoms typically wax and wane over time, varying in severity and duration. Many signs and symptoms are the same as those for mastocytosis, because both conditions result in too many mediators released by mast cells. It has many overlapping characteristics with recurrent idiopathic anaphylaxis, although there are distinguishing symptoms, specifically hives and angioedema. The condition may be mild until exacerbated by stressful life events, or symptoms may develop and slowly trend worse with time. MCAS symptoms are common in long COVID.

Common symptoms include:
 Dermatological
 flushing
 hives
 easy bruising
 either a reddish or a pale complexion
 itchiness
 burning feeling
 dermatographism
 Cardiovascular
 lightheadedness, dizziness, presyncope, syncope, arrhythmia, tachycardia
 Gastrointestinal
 diarrhea and/or constipation, cramping, intestinal discomfort
 nausea, vomiting, acid reflux
 swallowing difficulty, throat tightness
 Neuropsychiatric
 headache
 fatigue/lethargy
 lack of concentration
 mild cognitive problems
 Respiratory
 congestion, coughing, wheezing
 Systemic
 Anaphylaxis

Causes
There are many causes of mast cell activation, including allergy. Genetics may play a role. Symptoms of MCAS are caused by excessive chemical mediators released by mast cells. Mediators include leukotrienes, histamines, prostaglandin, and tryptase.

Pathophysiology 
Mast cell activation can be localized or systemic, but a diagnosis of MCAS requires systemic symptoms. Some examples of  tissue specific consequences of mast cell activation include urticaria, allergic rhinitis, and wheezing. Systemic mast cell activation presents with symptoms involving two or more organ systems (skin: urticaria, angioedema, and flushing; gastrointestinal: nausea, vomiting, diarrhea, and abdominal cramping; cardiovascular: hypotensive syncope or near syncope and tachycardia; respiratory: wheezing; naso-ocular: conjunctival injection, pruritus, and nasal stuffiness). This can result from the release of mediators from a specific site, such as the skin or mucosal tissue, or activation of mast cells around the vasculature.

Diagnosis
MCAS is often difficult to identify due to the heterogeneity of symptoms and the "lack of flagrant acute presentation". Many of the numerous symptoms are non-specific in nature. Diagnostic criteria were proposed in 2010 and revised in 2019.  Mast cell activation was assigned an ICD-10 code (D89.40, along with subtype codes D89.41-43 and D89.49) in October 2016.

Although different diagnostic criteria are published, a commonly used strategy to diagnose patients is to use all three of the following:

 Symptoms consistent with chronic/recurrent mast cell release:  Recurrent abdominal pain, diarrhea, flushing, itching, nasal congestion, coughing, chest tightness, wheezing, lightheadedness (usually a combination of some of these symptoms is present)
 Laboratory evidence of mast cell mediator (elevated serum tryptase, N-methyl histamine, prostaglandin D2 or 11-beta- prostaglandin F2 alpha, leukotriene E4 and others)
 Improvement in symptoms with the use of medications that block or treat elevations in these mediators

The World Health Organization has not published diagnostic criteria.

Treatment
Common pharmacological treatments include:
 Mast cell stabilizers, including cromolyn sodium and natural stabilizers such as quercetin
 H1-antihistamines, such as cetirizine or ketotifen or fexofenadine or loratadine
 H2-antihistamines, such as ranitidine or famotidine
 Antileukotrienes, such as montelukast or zileuton as well as natural products (e.g., curcumin or St. John's wort extracts)
 Nonsteroidal anti-inflammatory drugs, including aspirin can be very helpful in reducing inflammation in some patients, while others can have dangerous reactions

Prognosis
The prognosis of MCAS is uncertain.

History
The condition was hypothesized by the pharmacologists Oates and Roberts of Vanderbilt University in 1991, and following a build-up of evidence featured in papers by Sonneck et al. and Akin et al., named in 2007.

See also 
 FcεRI
 Histamine intolerance
 Immunoglobulin E

References 

Immune system disorders
Syndromes